Habash-e Sofla (also Romanized as Ḩabash-e Soflá) is a village in Qotur Rural District, Qatur District, Khoy County, West Azerbaijan Province, Iran. At the 2006 census, its population was 1,331, in 240 families.

References 

Populated places in Khoy County